Vedel Islands is a group of small islands lying  west of Hovgaard Island in the Wilhelm Archipelago. The largest island of this group was discovered in 1898 and given the name Vedel by the Belgian Antarctic Expedition under Gerlache. The French Antarctic Expedition under Charcot charted the remaining islands in 1904, and again in 1909, when the name was extended to include the entire group.

Islands in the group 

 Bager Island
 Friedburginsel
 Kamera Island
 Klamer Island
 Kormoran Island
 Kostenurka Island
 Lapa Island
 Pate Island
 Rak Island

See also 
 List of Antarctic and sub-Antarctic islands

Islands of the Wilhelm Archipelago